Wallace Turner Foote Jr. (April 7, 1864 – December 17, 1910) was a U.S. Representative from New York.

Born in Port Henry, New York, Foote attended the Port Henry Union School and Williston Seminary, Easthampton, Massachusetts, and was graduated as a civil engineer from Union College, Schenectady, New York, in 1885.
He served as assistant superintendent of the Cedar Point Furnace in Port Henry 1885–1887.
He attended Columbia Law School, New York City.
He was admitted to the bar in 1889 and commenced practice in Port Henry.

Foote was elected as a Republican to the Fifty-fourth and Fifty-fifth Congresses (March 4, 1895 – March 3, 1899).
He was not a candidate for renomination in 1898.
He resumed the practice of law and also engaged in mining.
He died in New York City on December 17, 1910.
He was interred in Union Cemetery, Port Henry, New York.

References

1864 births
1910 deaths
Columbia Law School alumni
Union College (New York) alumni
Republican Party members of the United States House of Representatives from New York (state)
People from Port Henry, New York
19th-century American politicians